Hatake is a surname. Notable people with the surname include:

 Kakashi Hatake, fictional character
 Seishu Hatake (born 1994), Japanese baseball player

Japanese-language surnames